Lazy Ways is the second album of the British indie pop group, Marine Girls. The album was released by Cherry Red Records in 1983. The song "Lazy Ways" appears on the Cherry Red showcase compilation Pillows & Prayers, while "A Place in the Sun" appears on Pillows and Prayers 2. The albums Lazy Ways and Beach Party were reissued together on one CD with bonus tracks by Cherry Red Records in 1988.

Reception
The album reached #4 in the UK Indie Charts in April 1983. A single from the album "Don't Come Back" had reached #21 in February. AllMusic awarded the album with 4 stars and its review by Stewart Mason states: "The Marine Girls' second and final album - the group had already split by the time of its release, with Tracey Thorn pursuing a solo career before forming Everything But the Girl and the Fox sisters forming the even more minimalist Grab Grab the Haddock - is far more polished than their 1981 debut, at times almost approaching professionalism".

It was ranked at 42/50 among the "Albums of the Year" in 1983 by NME.

Track listing 
 "A Place in the Sun" (Tracey Thorn) – 2:32
 "Leave Me with the Boy" (Jane Fox) – 1:50
 "Falling Again" (Fox) – 1:45
 "Love to Know" (Thorn) – 2:51
 "A Different Light" (Thorn) – 2:22
 "Sunshine Blue" (Thorn) – 2:05
 "Second Sight" (Thorn) – 2:57
 "Don’t Come Back" (Thorn) – 2:01
 "That Fink, Jazz-Me-Blues Boy" (Fox) – 1:33
 "Fever" (Eddie Cooley, John Davenport) – 2:14
 "Shell Island" (Fox) – 2:27
 "Lazy Ways" (Fox) – 2:42
 "Such a Thing" (Fox) – 2:21
 "You Must Be Mad" (Fox) – 2:00

Personnel 
 Alice Fox – vocals and percussion
 Tracey Thorn – guitar and vocals
 Jane Fox – bass
Guest musicians
 Timothy Charles Hall – saxophone

Charts

References 

1983 albums
Cherry Red Records albums